The Dying Land (French: La terre qui meurt) is a 1936 French colour drama film directed by Jean Vallée and starring Pierre Larquey, Simone Bourday and Line Noro. It is based on a novel by René Bazin.

The film's sets were designed by the art director Roland Quignon.

Cast
 Pierre Larquey  as Le père Lumineau 
 Robert Arnoux as François  
 Mady Berry as La Michelonne  
 Raymond Bouquet
 Simone Bourday as Marie Rose  
 Jean Cyrano 
 Paul Demange
 Georges Flamant 
 Lucien Gallas as André  
 Robert Goupil 
 Marcelle Monthil as La deuxième Michelonne  
 Line Noro as Eléonore  
 Alexandre Rignault as Matharin  
 Noël Roquevert 
 Germaine Sablon  as Felicite

See also
 List of early color feature films

References

Bibliography 
 Crisp, Colin. French Cinema—A Critical Filmography: Volume 1, 1929-1939. Indiana University Press, 2015.

External links 
 

1936 films
1930s color films
1936 drama films
French drama films
1930s French-language films
Films directed by Jean Vallée
Films based on French novels
1930s French films